During the 1998–99 English football season, Bradford City competed in the Football League First Division.

Season summary
In the summer, Jewell signed strikers Lee Mills from Port Vale and Isaiah Rankin from Arsenal, for £1 million and £1.3 million respectively, and signed former captain Stuart McCall from Rangers on a free transfer to lead the side. Despite a poor start, Bradford secured promotion to the top division for the first time in 77 years with a 3–2 victory over Wolverhampton Wanderers in the final game of the 1998-99 season. Bradford's success meant that Dean Windass, who had signed from Oxford United in March, became the club's third £1 million signing of the season: Windass had originally been signed for £950,000, but an additional fee of £50,000 was paid to Oxford because of Bradford's promotion.

Final league table

Results
Bradford City's score comes first

Legend

Football League First Division

Results per matchday

FA Cup

League Cup

First-team squad
Squad at end of season

Notes

References

Bradford City A.F.C. seasons
Bradford City